César Uribe Araya (born 28 November 1983) is a Chilean activist who was elected as a member of the Chilean Constitutional Convention.

References

External links
 BCN Profile

Living people
1984 births
Chilean people
21st-century Chilean politicians
Members of the List of the People
Members of the Chilean Constitutional Convention